The 2019–20 Southeast Missouri State Redhawks men's basketball team represented Southeast Missouri State University in the 2019–20 NCAA Division I men's basketball season. The Redhawks, led by fifth-year head coach Rick Ray, played their home games at the Show Me Center in Cape Girardeau, Missouri as members of the Ohio Valley Conference. They finished the season 7–24, 3–15 in OVC play to finish in last place. They failed to qualify for the OVC tournament.

On March 3, head coach Rick Ray was fired. He finished at Southeast Missouri State with a five-year record of 51–104. On March 23, the school named former Kansas State assistant coach Brad Korn the new head coach.

Previous season
The Redhawks finished the 2018–19 season 10–21 overall, 5–13 in OVC play, finishing in 11th place. Only the top eight teams can play in the OVC tournament, so the Redhawks did not qualify this season.

Roster

Schedule and results

|-
!colspan=9 style=| Exhibition

|-
!colspan=12 style=| Non-conference regular season

|-
!colspan=9 style=| Ohio Valley regular season

|-

Source

References

Southeast Missouri State Redhawks men's basketball seasons
Southeast Missouri State Redhawks
Southeast Missouri State Redhawks men's basketball
Southeast Missouri State Redhawks men's basketball